Liolaemus grosseorum is a species of lizard in the family Liolaemidae. It is native to Argentina.

References

grosseorum
Reptiles described in 2001
Reptiles of Argentina
Taxa named by Richard Emmett Etheridge